The YWCA is an association supporting women and girls.

YWCA or Y.W.C.A. may also refer to:

Y.W.C.A. Hioe Tjo Yoeng College, a government-aided, English medium instruction (EMI), grammar school in Ho Man Tin, Hong Kong. 
YWCA Site, an archaeological site in North Kingstown, Rhode Island
YWCA-Rolling Bay Route,  a shipping route that originated from Seattle, Washington
Wilcannia Airport, ICAO airport code "YWCA"

See also
YMCA (disambiguation)
The Y (disambiguation)
List of YWCA buildings